The 2006 Dartmouth Big Green football team was an American football team that represented Dartmouth College during the 2006 NCAA Division I FCS football season. The Big Green tied for last in the Ivy League.

In its second consecutive season under head coach Eugene "Buddy" Teevens (his seventh overall), the team compiled a 2–8 record and was outscored 244 to 147. Preston Copley and Michael Rabil were the team captains.

The Big Green's 2–5 conference record placed them in a three-way tie for sixth in the Ivy League standings. Dartmouth was outscored 146 to 105 by Ivy opponents. 

Dartmouth played its home games at Memorial Field on the college campus in Hanover, New Hampshire.

Schedule

References

Dartmouth
Dartmouth Big Green football seasons
Dartmouth Football